Askernish is a crofting community on South Uist, in the Outer Hebrides, Scotland. Askernish is in the parish of South Uist, and is situated on the A865 north of Daliburgh. The Askernish golf course, designed by Old Tom Morris, is located on the coast and has a view of the beach.

References

External links

Canmore - South Uist, Askernish, Askernish Golf Course site record
Canmore - South Uist, Askernish, Loch An Eilein site record
Canmore - South Uist, Askernish House site record

Villages on South Uist